Ross Bridge is an historic bridge in the town of Ross in central Tasmania, Australia, completed in July 1836. It crosses the Macquarie River.

The sandstone bridge was constructed by convict labour, and is the third oldest bridge still in use in Australia. Commissioned by Lieutenant-Governor George Arthur, the bridge was designed by architect John Lee Archer, with the convict work team including two stonemasons, James Colbeck and Daniel Herbert, the latter being credited with the intricate carvings along both sides of the bridge.

The bridge was registered on the now-defunct Register of the National Estate in 1978. Ross Bridge is listed on the Tasmanian Heritage Register (THR # 5289) and receives protection under the Tasmanian Historic Cultural Heritage Act 1995. Ross Bridge is also a nominated place on the National Heritage List.

The bridge is listed as a National Engineering Landmark by Engineers Australia as part of its Engineering Heritage Recognition Program.

References

Further reading

External links

 Tasmanian Times stories focusing on the likenesses of Jorgen Jorgenson
 Sydney Morning Herald Travel article about Ross
 Tasmanian visitors' guide tourism article about Ross 
 Ross Bridge Register of National Estate Listing
Ross Bridge National Heritage List (Nominated place listing)

Ross
Bridges completed in 1836
Convictism in Tasmania
Deck arch bridges
Sandstone bridges in Australia
Tasmanian places listed on the defunct Register of the National Estate
Tasmanian Heritage Register
1836 establishments in Australia
Stone arch bridges in Australia
Recipients of Engineers Australia engineering heritage markers